Lambros Malafouris is a Greek-British cognitive archaeologist who has pioneered the application of concepts from the philosophy of mind to the material record. He is Professor of Cognitive and Anthropological Archaeology at the University of Oxford. He is known for Material Engagement Theory, the idea that material objects in the archaeological record are part of the ancient human mind.

Education 
Malafouris completed his doctorate in archaeology in 2005 at the University of Cambridge under the supervision of Colin Renfrew.

Research 
Working with Renfrew, Malafouris developed an approach to the study of the human mind, past and present, known as Material Engagement Theory (MET). MET has three central tenets:

Cognition is extended and enacted because material forms are part of the mind and cognition is the interaction between brains, bodies, and material forms. 
Materiality has agency because it is able to influence change in brains and behaviors.
Meaning (signification) emerges through the active engagement of material forms. 

These tenets provide an archaeological framework that "offers a new way of understanding the nature of cognition itself" and establishes "the archaeological record as an integral part of the thinking process."

Important concepts developed by Malafouris include:
 metaplasticity, the idea that the plastic human mind “is embedded and inextricably enfolded within a plastic” material culture
 thinging, the idea that humans think with and through material things
 neuroarchaeology, an archaeology informed by neuroscience. Renfrew and Malafouris first suggested and thus coined the term.

In 2007, Malafouris, Renfrew, and Chris Frith co-hosted the first symposium on the origins and nature of human thought at the McDonald Institute for Archaeological Research, University of Cambridge. Between 2018 and 2020, Malafouris and Thomas G. Wynn co-hosted a collaboration between the University of Oxford and the University of Colorado, Colorado Springs to examine the archaeology of the Lower Paleolithic through MET; the results were published in the journal Adaptive Behavior in 2021.

Honors 
Malafouris was a Balzan Research Fellow in cognitive archaeology at the McDonald Institute for Archaeological Research, University of Cambridge, from 2005 to 2008.

Selected works

Authored books

Edited volumes

Special journal issues

Articles

Book chapters

See also

References

External links

Year of birth missing (living people)
Living people
Academics of the University of Oxford
Alumni of the University of Cambridge
British archaeologists
Greek emigrants to the United Kingdom